Embilipitiya Maha Vidyalaya, or EMV,  is a school in Sri Lanka which offers primary and secondary education. It was started in 1950 by Mr.Dissanayake. There was one building and forty children. It is one of the oldest schools in Ratnapura.  

Schools in Ratnapura District
Provincial schools in Sri Lanka